"For Free" is a song by American musician DJ Khaled featuring Canadian rapper Drake. It was released on June 3, 2016 by We the Best Music Group and Epic Records as the lead single from DJ Khaled's ninth studio album, Major Key. The song was produced by Nineteen85 and Jordan Ullman with co-production from Frankie Cutlass. The song was certified double platinum by the Recording Industry Association of America (RIAA) on May 31, 2017, for selling over two million copies in the United States.

Background 
On Snapchat, DJ Khaled talked about "the Drake vocals finally [being] in", referencing the then unreleased song. The hip hop song samples lyrics and cadences from Too Short's "Blow the Whistle", produced by Lil Jon, and interpolates Akinyele's "Fuck Me For Free", produced by platinum producer Frankie Cutlass. One of Drake's verses pays homage to Kendrick Lamar's To Pimp a Butterfly song, "For Free? (Interlude)".

Chart performance 
On the chart dated June 25, 2016, "For Free" entered the US Billboard Hot 100 at number 18, powered by first-week digital download sales of 104,748 copies. It became DJ Khaled's fourth highest-charting single, peaking at number 13 in its ninth week (behind 2011's "I'm on One" with Drake, Rick Ross and Lil Wayne and 2017's "Wild Thoughts", with Rihanna and Bryson Tiller and "I'm the One", with Justin Bieber, Quavo, Chance the Rapper, and Lil Wayne). In the United Kingdom, the song peaked at number 25, while peaking at number 47 in Canada and at number 79 in France, making it Khaled's most successful single in those countries until the release of "I'm the One" in the UK and Canada and "Wild Thoughts" in France.

Charts

Weekly charts

Year-end charts

Certifications

Release history

References

External links

2016 songs
2016 singles
DJ Khaled songs
Drake (musician) songs
Song recordings produced by Majid Jordan
Song recordings produced by Nineteen85
Songs written by Drake (musician)
Songs written by DJ Khaled
Songs written by Jordan Ullman
Songs written by Nineteen85
Epic Records singles